Radków may refer to the following places:
Radków in Lower Silesian Voivodeship (south-west Poland)
Radków, Lublin Voivodeship (east Poland)
Radków, Świętokrzyskie Voivodeship (south-central Poland)